Div Kola-ye Olya (also Romanized as Dīv Kolā-ye ‘Olyā; also known as Dīv Kalāy and Dīv Kolā-ye Bālā) is a village in Nowkand Kola Rural District, in the Central District of Qaem Shahr County, Mazandaran Province, Iran. At the 2006 census, its population was 484, in 130 families.

References 

Populated places in Qaem Shahr County